Jerry Reese (born July 22, 1963) is a former American football executive, player, and coach. He was a member of the New York Giants for 23 years, serving as their general manager from 2007 to 2017 where he won two Super Bowls. He was inducted into the Tennessee Sports Hall of Fame in 2009.

Early life and career
Reese is a native of Tiptonville, Tennessee, where he played for the Lake County Falcons' 1980 state champion 1-A high school football team. He played for the University of Tennessee at Martin where he was later an assistant coach before taking a job as a scout for the New York Giants.  From 2002 until becoming general manager in 2007, he was the Director of Player Personnel for the Giants.

Executive career

New York Giants
Reese succeeded Ernie Accorsi as general manager on January 16, 2007. He participated in the Giants' success in the 2007 NFL Draft, which included the selections of Aaron Ross, Steve Smith, Jay Alford, Kevin Boss, Michael Johnson, Ahmad Bradshaw, and Zak DeOssie. Some of them played important roles in the Giants' Super Bowl XLII victory. Prior to the start of Giants mini-camp in May 2008, Reese and the Giants were invited by President George W. Bush to the White House to honor their Super Bowl victory.

Reese had his second Super Bowl victory in 2011 when the Giants won Super Bowl XLVI over the Patriots.

In 2017, the Giants were marred by numerous player injuries and other known controversies. After a 2–10 record to start the 2017 year, Reese was fired by the Giants after serving 23 years in the front office, along with the firing of head coach Ben McAdoo.

Personal life
Reese is married to Gwen Moore. They have two children, Jasmyne Danielle and Jerry II. He resides in Jefferson Township, New Jersey, where his son J.R. played quarterback for the Jefferson Township High School football team.

References

External links
 New York Giants profile

1963 births
Living people
St. Augustine High School (New Orleans) alumni
New York Giants executives
UT Martin Skyhawks football coaches
UT Martin Skyhawks football players
National Football League general managers
People from Tiptonville, Tennessee
People from Jefferson Township, New Jersey
Players of American football from Tennessee
African-American sports executives and administrators
American sports executives and administrators
21st-century African-American people
20th-century African-American sportspeople